Esther Hart (born Esther Katinka Hartkamp on 3 June 1970 in Epe, Gelderland) is a Dutch singer.

Career
Hart entered BBC TV's A Song for Europe contest in 2003 with the song "Wait for the Moment". She withdrew from that contest as participating for two countries would not have been acceptable for both BBC and NOS. She opted for participating in Nationaal Songfestival, the Dutch heat of the Eurovision Song Contest, and won. Her song, "One More Night", was placed 13th in the 2003 Eurovision Song Contest. She read the Dutch results at Eurovision 2004 and Eurovision 2008.

Activism
On 17 January 2008, Hart willingly went to jail and stayed overnight in an attempt to gain publicity and money for charity. During that time she gave a concert with the Dutch broadcaster NCRV (Dutch Christian Radio Association) and the Exodus Foundation, which provides assistance for former prisoners to adapt to normal life. In addition, a poetry contest was held by the prisoners with the theme of "dare to believe in change", with the winning poem to be read by Hart.

References

External links

1970 births
Living people
People from Epe, Netherlands
Eurovision Song Contest entrants for the Netherlands
Dutch pop singers
Eurovision Song Contest entrants of 2003
English-language singers from the Netherlands
21st-century Dutch singers
21st-century Dutch women singers
Nationaal Songfestival contestants